The cassette adapter allows another source of music to be played through sound systems with a tape player. This is useful for vehicles without auxiliary (aux) ports or CD players.

Usage
Patented on March 29, 1988, a cassette tape adapter is a device that allows the use of portable audio players in older cassette decks. Originally designed to connect portable CD players to car stereos that only had cassette players, the cassette tape adapter has become popular with portable media players even on cars that have CD players built in. Today, it is primarily used for vehicles without auxiliary ports built into their stereo systems. For vehicles with AM/FM systems, but no cassette playback, FM transmitters are recommended.

A typical cassette adapter uses a single-sided writing tape head (similar to the recording head on a traditional tape deck) connected to a stereo minijack connector with a cord.  The cord is connected to the device's output (or headphones) port and the electrical signal is converted into a magnetic signal by the head.  This magnetic signal is then received by the tape deck's reading head, converted back into an electrical signal, and amplified by the sound system.  Because most cassette adapters use a single-sided head, they only work in one direction.  There are, however, some cassette adapters that have double-sided heads that work in either direction. One-way gears within the cassette simulate tape movement from reel to reel, to ensure that the deck does not auto-reverse.

A newer type of adapter is a type of MP3 player shaped like a cassette tape, which can be used as a stand-alone MP3 player with headphones or inserted as a cassette into the cassette player, where it can be used with a remote control. These usually have a double-sided head which means they can work in both directions.

Another type of cassette adapter is the Bluetooth cassette adapter. It has the shape of a standard cassette, but has a built-in audio Bluetooth receiver module, a simple power supply to allow charging and power and a small battery. Usually, they may power on when the cassette player is set on play, and power off when the cassette player is stopped. They have a switch under the head. Some may as well operate as stand-alone adapters, having also a separate power switch. Charging is done externally. Operation is simple, just like the cassette shaped MP3 player. It is simply inserted in the cassette player like any cassette, set on play, and music from a Bluetooth device like a mobile phone or laptop can be played through the cassette player. 

A common alternative to cassette adapters is FM transmitters.  These devices often require external power and convert the device's electrical signal into radio waves which are then transmitted over an unused FM frequency to a nearby FM tuner.  The cassette adapter is usually considered superior as it is much less prone to interference.

Applications

A cassette adapter could also be used with other audio equipment, such as a microphone, handheld game console, or laptop computer. It can also be used in a home tape deck to play sound from any equipment, such as a personal computer, when computer speakers are in short supply.

Hands-free cell phone, where a microphone and aux cable are connected to the cassette tape which broadcasts the audio from the call to the car's speakers
CD player (the original application for cassette adapters)
FM radio
HD radio (for the large numbers of receivers that do not natively support this broadcast standard)
Laptop computer
Portable media players (iPod, MP3 player, Zune)

Mechanism
A cassette adapter is shaped like a cassette tape.  However, instead of having reels of tape inside, it has a transmitting head where the tape is normally read by the reading head.  This transmitting head is connected to the input cord, which connects the head to the audio source.  A cassette adapter must also include a mechanism that simulates tape movement.  Modern cassette players monitor tape movement to detect when the tape ends.  This is done using a rolling wheel that rides against the tape.  To simulate tape movement, a system of gears or a drive belt connects the tape player's drive motor (via the take-up spindle) to a wheel inside the adapter.  This wheel rides against the detection wheel to simulate tape movement.  Because the wheel never stops spinning, the deck never senses an end-of-tape and never tries to reverse the tape. Some adapters contain a one way locking mechanism, to stop the detection wheel if the tape is played in the wrong direction (and thus reading the wrong side of the head). The stopped wheel then would cause the cassette player to either stop the tape, or reverse the direction if the player supports it.

See also
FM transmitter (personal device)
FlashPath
Vehicle audio

References

Audio storage
Automotive accessories
Repurposing